Perle was a  built for the French Navy in the mid-1930s. Laid down in 1931, she was launched in July 1935 and commissioned in March 1937. In November 1942, after Operation Torch, Perle joined the Allied fleet. While returning from refitting in the United States, Perle was mistaken for a U-boat by an aircraft from the British ship Empire MacCallum and sunk.

Design

She carried a complement of 42 men

The Saphir-class submarines were constructed to be able to launch torpedoes and lay mines without surfacing. They were attached to the submarine's exterior under a hydrodynamic protection.

Service history 
Laid down in 1931, Perle was launched in July 1935 and commissioned in March 1937. In November 1942, after Operation Torch, Perle joined the Allied fleet and was assigned to Dakar. After taking part in several operations, Perle sailed to the United States for refitting. On 26 June 1944, it left port and, after stopping in Newfoundland, Perle set sail for the port of Dundee in Scotland to participate in operations off Norway. On 8 July, Perle was mistaken for a U-boat by an Allied Fairey Swordfish and sunk in position . Approximately 17 of the crew of 42 survived the sinking but only one was rescued. The crew killed aboard Perle were the last casualties among French submariners in World War II.

See also 

 List of submarines of France
 French submarines of World War II

Citations

Books 

Submarines of France
World War II submarines of France
Saphir-class submarines (1928)
Submarines sunk by aircraft
Ships sunk by British aircraft
World War II shipwrecks in the Atlantic Ocean
Friendly fire incidents of World War II
1935 ships